The following highways are numbered 345:

Australia
 - Victoria

Canada
 Manitoba Provincial Road 345
 New Brunswick Route 345
 Newfoundland and Labrador Route 345
 Prince Edward Island Route 345
 Quebec Route 345

Japan
 Japan National Route 345

United States
  Interstate 345 (unsigned)
  Arkansas Highway 345
 Florida:
  Florida State Road 345
  County Road 345 (Levy County, Florida)
  New York State Route 345
  North Carolina Highway 345
  Ohio State Route 345
  Pennsylvania Route 345
  Puerto Rico Highway 345
 Texas:
  Texas State Highway 345
  Texas State Highway Loop 345
  Virginia State Route 345
 Virginia State Route 345 (former)
  Wyoming Highway 345